Market Road Films is an independent production company founded in 2003 by Lynn Nottage, Pulitzer Prize-winning playwright, and Tony Gerber, Emmy Award-winning director. The company is based in New York. The company produces character-driven, feature-length work, as well as music videos, commercials, museum installations, and new media.

Market Road Films produces work in both fiction and non-fiction, with topics spanning over international and universal concern. The company has produced films for National Geographic, such as the Congo Bush Pilots, Kingdom of the White Wolf, Fighting ISIS, Battle for Virunga, and the award-winning feature, Full Battle Rattle. Recently the company produced the documentary short, Takeover!, as well as the Peabody-Award nominated podcast, Unfinished: Deep South.

References

External links
 Official website
 Congo Bush Pilots IMDB
 Full Battle Rattle IMDB

Film production companies of the United States
Companies based in New York City